Si Rat Malai ('Four Malay States') is a former administrative division of Thailand. It included the four northern states of Kedah, Perlis, Kelantan, and Terengganu in British Malaya annexed by the Axis-aligned Thai government after the Japanese invasion of Malaya.

The Thai authorities made Alor Setar the centre for the administration of the territory. Thailand administered the states as Syburi, Palit, Kalantan and Trangkanu provinces from 18 October 1943 until the surrender of the Japanese at the end of the war.

History
On 14 December 1941 General Plaek Phibunsongkhram, then Prime Minister of Thailand, signed a secret agreement with the Japanese Empire and committed the Thai armed forces to participate in the planned Burma Campaign. An alliance between Thailand and Japan was formally signed on 21 December 1941.

On 25 January 1942, the Thai government, believing the Allies beaten, declared war on the United States and the United Kingdom. As a reward for entering into a military alliance with the Japanese, the latter agreed to return to Thailand the four British Malayan provinces of Kedah, Perlis, Kelantan, and Terengganu which had been ceded to the British under the Anglo-Siamese Treaty of 1909.

After occupation on 20 August 1943, an agreement on the surrender of the four states was signed in Bangkok, between Phibunsongkhram and the Japanese ambassador, Teiji Tonbukami. Among the conditions found in the agreement it was stated that Japan would hand over the administration of the four Malay states to Thailand within 60 days after the signature of the document.

On 18 October 1943, the four Malay states were transferred to Thailand. On the occasion Prime Minister Phibunsongkhram declared that the citizens of the annexed states were to be granted equal treatment to the inhabitants of other parts of Thailand. The Japanese authorities, however, retained a great degree of control. Japanese troops and Kempeitai continued to be stationed in the four states. Rail services would be run by Thai officers only in Kelantan, while the rail links in Kedah and Perlis would remain in Japanese hands. The Japanese also had the full control of the telegraph, post and telephone services over the nominally Thai territories.

Thailand was still allied with Japan when the war ended, but the United States proposed a solution. In September 1945 British control of the four states was reinstated, under the BMA. On 1 April 1946 the former Thai-occupied states joined the Malayan Union.

Administration

The Thai administrative service in the northern Malay states was relatively small and the officers were more concentrated in carrying out military and police duties, and foreign relations.
The administrative service was carried out by civil servants who were under military supervision.

Kedah

Japanese Governors
 1941 - Mar 1942 Ojama
 Mar 1942 - Oct 1943 Sukegawa Seiji (Seichi)

Thai Military Commissioner
 Oct 1943 - 1945?           Pramote Chongcharoen

Thai General-commissioners
Administering Kedah, Kelantan and Terengganu:
 20 August 1943 - Oct 1943 Kamol Saraphaisariddhikan Chotikasathian
 Oct 1943 - 1945?           Chierlah Kamol Sribhaasairadhikavan Josikasarthien

Kelantan

Japanese Governors
 1941 - 1943 Yasushi Sunakawan
 1943 - 20 August 1943 Kikura Fujisawa

Thai Military Commissioners
 1943 - 1944 Charu Chaichan
 1944 - 1945 Tharin Rawang Phu

Terengganu

Japanese Governors
 Dec 1941 - 18 March 1942     ....
 18 March 1942 - Jul 1943 Manabu Kuji

Thai Military Commissioner
 20 August 1943 - Aug 1945 Prayoon Ratanakit

Perlis

Japanese Governors
 1941 - 1942 Ohyama Kikancho
 Mar 1942 - 20 August 1943 Sukegawa Seiji (Osagawa)

Thai Military Commissioner
 20 August 1943 -  8 September 1945 Charn Na Song Khram

See also
 Anglo-Siamese Treaty of 1909
 Japanese occupation of Malaya
 Thailand in World War II

References

External links
 Malaysia - Thailand Boundary
 The Land Boundaries of Indochina: Cambodia, Laos and Vietnam
 Maps of Malaya

Former provinces of Thailand
1942 in Thailand
1942 in British Malaya
South-East Asian theatre of World War II
Military history of Thailand during World War II
British Malaya
Japan–Thailand relations
History of Kedah
History of Perlis
History of Kelantan
History of Terengganu
British Empire in World War II
British Malaya in World War II